Discovery Home can mean:
Discovery Home or Discovery Home & Leisure, a U.S digital cable channel founded in 1998 and renamed as Planet Green; currently Destination America
Discovery Home & Health, a worldwide television channel formally known as Discovery Health